Sana Saleem is a Pakistani journalist and human rights activist who co-founded the not-for-profit  free-speech group Bolo Bhi. Saleem was selected as one of the BBC's 100 Women in 2014.

References

Living people
Internet censorship in Pakistan
Pakistani human rights activists
Pakistani women journalists
BBC 100 Women
Year of birth missing (living people)